Evolution is the fourth album (second published worldwide) by the American vocalist, pianist and songwriter Oleta Adams and was released in 1993. The album is the follow up to Adams' worldwide hit album Circle of One and is fully produced by Stewart Levine. Like its predecessor, Evolution consists of songs with a mix of jazz, soul, pop and gospel. Evolution features three cover versions: the James Taylor song "Don't Let Me Be Lonely Tonight", Billy Joel's "New York State of Mind" and Ivan Lins' "Evolution". Adams wrote six of the twelve album tracks, and it also features a song written by songwriter Diane Warren.

Commercial performance
Evolution entered the top 10 in the UK Albums Chart. However, without the aid of a big hit single, the album dropped quickly and only stayed in the charts for seven weeks. In the US, the album peaked at #67 and stayed only 13 weeks in the charts. It had more success in continental Europe, most notably in the Netherlands where it peaked at #6 and stayed in the chart for almost a year.

Singles
Five singles were taken from the album. The lead single, "I Just Had to Hear Your Voice", failed to become a big hit as "Get Here" had been for her previous album. It peaked at #42 in the UK Singles Chart and did not chart in the US Billboard Hot 100. Other singles failed to chart in both countries. However, they sold better in continental Europe. These were the gospel-tinged "Window of Hope", "Easier to Say (Goodbye)", "My Heart Won't Lie" and "The Day I Stop Loving You".

Track listing

Personnel 
 Oleta Adams – lead vocals, arrangements, acoustic piano (1, 2, 4, 5, 7-12), synthesizers (1, 2, 4, 5, 7, 8, 10, 11, 12), Fender Rhodes (3), backing vocals (6, 7)
 Aaron Zigman – keyboards (1, 6), synthesizers (1, 5), programming (2, 4, 8, 10, 12), horns (7), strings (11)
 Neil Larsen – Hammond B3 organ (3, 5, 10)
 Michael Landau – guitars (1-6, 10, 11), guitar solo (7), acoustic guitar and solo (9)
 Ray Fuller – guitars (4, 7, 8, 12)
 Freddie Washington – bass guitar (1, 2, 4, 5, 7, 10, 11), fretless bass (3, 9)
 Jerry Knight – bass guitar (6), backing vocals (6)
 Larry Kimpel – bass guitar (8, 12)
 Richie Stevens – drums (1-5, 7-12), programming (4, 7, 11, 12), additional programming (6)
 Gota Yashiki – drums (6), programming (6)
 Lenny Castro – percussion (2, 4, 6-9, 12)
 Tom Scott – tenor saxophone (2, 10, 11)
 David Sanborn – alto saxophone (3)
 Chuck Findley – flugelhorn solo (4), muted trumpet (6), trumpet (10)
 Stewart Levine – arrangements (all tracks)
 Paulette Brown – backing vocals (7, 12)
 Bunny Hill – backing vocals (7, 12)
 Arnold McCuller – backing vocals (7, 12)
 Ricky Nelson – backing vocals (7, 12) 
 Valerie Pinkston-Mayo – backing vocals (7, 12)
 Fred White – backing vocals (7, 12)
 Perri (Carolyn, Darlene, Lori and Sharon Perry) – backing vocals (12)

Production 
 Producer – Stewart Levine
 Recorded and Mixed by Daren Klein at Andora Studios (North Hollywood, CA).
 Second Engineer – Gonzalo "Bino" Espinoza
 Mastered by Bernie Grundman at Bernie Grundman Mastering (Hollywood, CA).
 Design – Peter Barrett and Andrew Biscomb
 Photography – Randee St. Nicholas

Charts

Weekly charts

Year-end charts

References

1993 albums
Oleta Adams albums
Albums produced by Stewart Levine
Fontana Records albums